Operation Plunder was a military operation to cross the Rhine on the night of 23 March 1945, launched by the 21st Army Group under Field Marshal Bernard Montgomery. The crossing of the river was at Rees, Wesel, and south of the river Lippe by the British Second Army under Lieutenant General Miles Dempsey, and the United States Ninth Army under Lieutenant General William H. Simpson.

The First Allied Airborne Army conducted Operation Varsity on the east bank of the Rhine in support of Operation Plunder, consisting of U.S. XVIII Airborne Corps, the British 6th and the U.S. 17th Airborne Divisions.

Preparations such as accumulation of supplies, road construction, and the transport of 36 Royal Navy landing craft, were hidden by a massive smoke screen from 16 March. The operation commenced on the night of 23 March 1945. It included the Varsity parachute and glider landings near Wesel, and Operation Archway, by the Special Air Service.

Battle
Four thousand Allied guns fired for four hours during the opening bombardment. British bombers contributed with attacks on Wesel during the day and night of 23 March 1945.

On the night of 23 March, companies E and C of the 17th Armored Engineer Battalion, part of the U.S. 2nd Armored Division, constructed treadway rafts to prepare the crossing of the Rhine about five kilometers south of Wesel. Bridge construction started at 9:45am and by 4:00pm the first truck crossed the floating pontoon bridge. Over  of M2 treadway and 93 pneumatic floats were laid in the six hours and fifteen minute construction project, a record setting for the size of the bridge. It took twenty-five 2-and-a-half ton GMC CCKW trucks to transport the bridge parts to the construction site, part of the Red Ball Express.

Three Allied formations made the initial assault: the British XII Corps and XXX Corps and the U.S. XVI Corps. The British 79th Armoured Division—under Major General Percy Hobart — had been at the front of the Normandy landings and provided invaluable help in subsequent operations with specially adapted armored vehicles (known as Hobart's Funnies). One "funny" was the LVT-2 "Buffalo" operated by the 4th Royal Tank Regiment, under the command of Lieutenant Colonel Alan Jolly, an armed and armoured amphibious tracked personnel or cargo transporter, which was able to cross soft and flooded ground. These were the vehicles for the spearhead infantry.

The first part of Plunder was initiated by the 51st (Highland) Infantry Division, led by the 7th Battalion, Black Watch (Royal Highland Regiment) of 154th Brigade at 21:00 on 23 March, near Rees, followed by the 7th Battalion, Argyll and Sutherland Highlanders (also of 154th Brigade). At 02:00 on 24 March, the 15th (Scottish) Infantry Division landed between Wesel and Rees. At first, there was no opposition, but later they ran into determined resistance from machine-gun nests. On the same day the 51st Division's commander, Major-General Tom Rennie, was killed by mortar fire. The British 1st Commando Brigade entered Wesel.

The U.S. 30th Infantry Division landed south of Wesel. The local resistance had been broken by artillery and air bombardment. Subsequently, the U.S. 79th Infantry Division also landed. American casualties were minimal. German resistance to the British landings continued with some effect, and there were armored counter-attacks. Landings continued, however, including tanks and other heavy equipment. U.S. forces had a bridge across by the evening of 24 March.

Operation Varsity started at 10:00 on 24 March, to disrupt enemy communications. Despite heavy resistance to the airdrops and afterward, the airborne troops made progress and repelled counterattacks. The hard lessons of Operation Market Garden were applied. In the afternoon, the 15th (Scottish) Division linked up with both airborne divisions.

Fierce German resistance continued around Bienen, north of Rees, where the entire 9th Canadian Infantry Brigade was needed to relieve the Black Watch. The bridgehead was firmly established, however, and Allied advantages in numbers and equipment were applied.

Aftermath

Impact on German forces and command
The Allied operation was opposed by the German 1st Parachute Army, commanded by  Alfred Schlemm, a part of Army Group H. Although this formation was considered to be the most effective German force in the area, it was severely depleted from its previous action in the Battle of the Reichswald. Unable to withstand Allied pressure, the 1st Parachute Army withdrew northeast toward Hamburg and Bremen, leaving a gap between it and the 15th Army in the Ruhr.

Joseph Goebbels was well aware of Plunder's potential impact from the beginning. On 24 March, he began his diary entry with, "The situation in the West has entered an extraordinarily critical, ostensibly almost deadly, phase." He went on to note the crossing of the Rhine on a broad front, and foresaw Allied attempts to encircle the Ruhr industrial heartland.

On 27 March, command of the 1st Parachute Army was passed to  Günther Blumentritt, because Schlemm had been wounded. Blumentritt and his superior,  Johannes Blaskowitz, both recognised that the situation was lost. The army's front was incomplete, there were no reserves, weak artillery, no air support and few tanks. Communications were weak, indeed, one corps was never contacted. The reinforcements were so poor that the generals decided against using them, to avoid needless casualties.

Although Blumentritt had strict orders from Supreme Command to hold and fight, from 1 April, he managed a withdrawal with minimal casualties, eventually withdrawing beyond the Dortmund-Ems Canal to the Teutoburg Forest. Within a week of the start of Plunder, the Allies had taken 30,000 prisoners of war north of the Ruhr.

Winston Churchill

British Prime Minister Winston Churchill was present at Field Marshal Montgomery's headquarters near Venlo on the eve of Plunder. Subsequently, Churchill and Montgomery watched the Varsity air landings on 24 March.

The next day, 25 March, Churchill and Montgomery visited General Dwight D. Eisenhower′s headquarters. After lunch and a briefing, the party went to a sandbagged house overlooking the Rhine and a quiet, undefended stretch of the German-held riverbank. After Eisenhower's departure, Churchill, Montgomery, and a party of U.S. commanders and armed guards took a LCVP landing craft and landed for 30 minutes in enemy territory, without challenge. They next visited the destroyed railway bridge at Wesel, departing when German artillery appeared to target them.

Military rivalries
The Plunder crossings in the third week of March were planned as the primary assault across the Rhine, but at the Yalta Conference in early February 1945, it was decided to add another crossing to the south of the Ruhr. The additional crossing was intended to draw off any concentration of forces in opposition to Plunder. Two earlier crossing actually happened.

On 7 March, U.S. troops unexpectedly captured the Ludendorff Bridge during the Battle of Remagen. Within the next 10 days six divisions and 25,000 troops established a bridgehead on the eastern side of the Rhine.

On 22 March, General George S. Patton sent his Third Army across the Rhine, at Nierstein, to form another bridgehead. His superior, General Omar Bradley, released news of this crossing to the press "at a time calculated to take some of the luster from the news of Montgomery′s crossing."
Bradley later remembered that Patton had strongly urged the announcement saying "I want the world to know that Third Army made it before Monty starts across".

In culture 
 "Crossing the Rhine", Episode 8 of The Lost Evidence, The History Channel, UK, 2004
 Heinz Bosch, Wilhelm Haas: Der Krieg am Niederrhein, Kreis Kleve, 1976 (German)
 “World War II”: season 5, episode 8 of “Drunk History”

See also 
 Ludendorff Bridge, the bridge at Remagen

Notes

Bibliography

 
 
 
 
 
 
 

 
1945 in Germany
Battles of World War II involving Canada
Battles of World War II involving the United States
Land battles of World War II involving the United Kingdom
March 1945 events
Rhine